Melissa Provenzano (born May 4, 1972) is an American politician who has served in the Oklahoma House of Representatives from the 79th district since 2018.

Early life
Provenzano earned her Bachelor of Science degree in Organismic Biology from Northeastern State University and her M.Ed. in
Educational Leadership from the University of Oklahoma.

References

1972 births
Living people
Democratic Party members of the Oklahoma House of Representatives
21st-century American politicians
21st-century American women politicians
Women state legislators in Oklahoma